Epirodrilus is a genus of annelids belonging to the family Naididae. Its class is Clitellata.

Species:

Epirodrilus michaelseni

References

Annelids